The 1982 Sun Belt Conference men's basketball tournament was held February 26–28 at the Birmingham–Jefferson Civic Center in Birmingham, Alabama.

In a rematch of the previous two finals (both won by the Rams), UAB topped VCU in the championship game, 94–83, to win their first Sun Belt men's basketball tournament.

The Blazers, in turn, received an automatic bid for the 1982 NCAA tournament, where they advanced to the Elite Eight (UAB defeated Indiana in the Second Round and Virginia in the Sweet Sixteen before ultimately losing to Louisville).

Format
With the departure of Georgia State before the season, the Sun Belt's membership decreased once again to six teams. In turn, the two top-seeded teams were given byes to the semifinal rounds while the remaining four teams entered the competition in the first round. All teams were seeded based on regular season conference records.

Bracket

References

Sun Belt Conference men's basketball tournament
Tournament
Sun Belt Conference men's basketball tournament
Sun Belt Conference men's basketball tournament